Yelena Aleksandrovna Maksimova (November 23, 1905 – September 23, 1986) was a Soviet film actress, Honored Artist of the RSFSR (1958).

Selected filmography 
 Women of Ryazan (1927) as  Lukerya
 The Last Attraction (1929) as  Polly
 An Hour with Chekhov (1929) as  housemaid
 Earth (1930) as  Natalya, Vasili's fiancée
  And Quiet Flows the Don (1930) as  Daria Melekhova
  Aerograd (1935) as   Maria Kudina
 The Nightingale (1936) as Tanya
 Timur and His Team (1940) as a woman selling milk
 First-Year Student (1948) as flower girl
 The Young Guard (1948) as Valeriya Borts's mother
 Bountiful Summer (1951) as Kolodchka
 Admiral Ushakov (1953) as Senyavinova
 The Frigid Sea (1954) as Dergachikha
 Two Captains (1955) as aunt Dasha
 Other People's Relatives (1955) as  Varvara Stepanovna
 The Grasshopper (1955) as peasant woman from Glukhov
 For the Power of the Soviets (1956) as Natalia's mother
 A Crazy Day (1956) as episode
 The Height (1957) as Berestova
 Sasha Enters Life (1957) as Sasha's mother
 Trubachyov's Detachment Is Fighting (1957) as Baba Ivga
 And Quiet Flows the Don (1958) as Koshevoy's mother
 A Home for Tanya (1960) as Markarikha
 Chronicle of Flaming Years (1961) as episode
 Probation (1960) as victim of crime
 Yevdokiya (1961) as Maryushka
 Introduction to Life (1962) as landlord
 No Fear, No Blame (1962) as janitor
 Seven Nannies (1963) as controller
 It Happened at the Police Station (1963) as Alevtina Borisovna
 Father of a Soldier (1964) as  Borya's granny
 At Early Morning (1965) as  Dimka's mother
  Beloved (1965) as  Nina Petrovna
  The Polynin Case (1970) as  housekeeper in the Balakirevs house
  This Merry Planet (1973) as   Prokhor's mother
  The Red Snowball Tree  (1973) as guest of the Baikalovs
  The Sky Is Beyond the Clouds  (1973) as Yevgeny's mother
 Sea Cadet of Northern Fleet  (1973) as woman in the police
 Investigation Held by ZnaToKi.  At Any Сost (1977) as Praskovya Andreevna
  Carnival (1981) as  visitor of the pawnshop
  Resident Return (1982) as  Utkin's neighbor
  Chance (1984) as  Praskovya

References

External links
 

1905 births
1986 deaths
Actresses from Moscow
Communist Party of the Soviet Union members
Soviet film actresses
Soviet television actresses
Honored Artists of the RSFSR